Addams is a patronymic surname of English origin from the given name Adam. There are other spellings. Notable people with the surname include:

Calpernia Addams (born 1971), American transgender author, actress, and activist
Christian Hejnal Addams (born 1969), American producer and musician
Charles Addams (1912–1988), American cartoonist, author of "The Addams Family"
Dawn Addams (1930–1985), English actress
Jane Addams (1860–1935), American founder of the Settlement House movement
Jessicka Addams (born 1975), Italian-American artist, musician, and activist
Olivia Addams (born 1996), Romanian singer
William Addams (1777–1858), American politician, U.S. representative from Pennsylvania

Fictional characters:
“The Addams Family”, American print cartoon by Charles Addams; and television series, films, and video games based on the cartoon

English-language surnames